Ennery may refer to:

Places
France
Ennery, Moselle, a commune in the Moselle department
Ennery, Val-d'Oise, a commune in the Val-d'Oise department
Chailly-lès-Ennery, a commune in the Moselle department

Haiti
Ennery, Artibonite, a commune in the Artibonite department

See also
Adolphe d'Ennery (1811–1899), a French dramatist and novelist